In Greek mythology, Polites was the legitimate son of King Priam and Queen Hecuba and was known for his swiftness. He was a prince of Troy, and brother of 49 other children, including 12 daughters. He was killed by Neoptolemus (Pyrrhus), son of Achilles, who then killed his father. He is also known by his family as "defender of Troy."

Mythology

Early life 

Polites was born to Priam, King of Troy, and Hecuba, his wife. He lived in Troy during his youth, was crowned prince of Troy, and was styled his royal Majesty. During his youth, Polites witnessed the Trojan War and was a supporting character in the Iliad. 

Family

"King Priam though is arguably more famous for his own children than for any act or deed during the Trojan War; and indeed the children of King Priam number amongst the most famous individuals of Greek mythology". "Priam divorced Arisbe to wed Hecuba. He had several other wives as well, resulting in the birth of 50 sons along with several daughters." Many of his siblings' played a big role throughout Troy and the Trojan War.

Death in the Trojan War 

During the episode of the Trojan Horse in the Trojan War, Polites was one of those who accepted the gift. During the fall of Troy and the attempted escape to Latium, Neoptolemus shot an arrow in Polites' leg. Polites fell, escaping Neoptolemus, who pursued Polites to his father's palace. Priam called on the gods to punish Neoptolemus, but in that scene, Priam was also killed by Neoptolemus. His killer was "a Greek Legend and the son of Achilles, the hero of the Greek army at Troy."

Namesake 
 Asteroid 4867 Polites, named after Polites

See also 
 List of children of Priam

Notes

References 

 Homer, The Iliad with an English Translation by A.T. Murray, Ph.D. in two volumes. Cambridge, MA., Harvard University Press; London, William Heinemann, Ltd. 1924. Online version at the Perseus Digital xLibrary.
 Homer, Homeri Opera in five volumes. Oxford, Oxford University Press. 1920. Greek text available at the Perseus Digital Library.
 Publius Vergilius Maro, Aeneid. Theodore C. Williams. trans. Boston. Houghton Mifflin Co. 1910. Online version at the Perseus Digital Library.
 Publius Vergilius Maro, Bucolics, Aeneid, and Georgics. J. B. Greenough. Boston. Ginn & Co. 1900. Latin text available at the Perseus Digital Library.
“Neoptolemus.” Encyclopædia Britannica, Encyclopædia Britannica, Inc., www.britannica.com/topic/Neoptolemus.
“The Children of Priam in Greek Mythology.” Greek Legends and Myths, www.greeklegendsandmyths.com/children-of-priam.html.
Prof. Geller, et al. “Priam - Greek King of Troy.” Mythology.net, 1 Nov. 2016, mythology.net/greek/heroes/priam/.

Characters in the Odyssey
Trojans
Characters in the Aeneid
Children of Priam
Princes in Greek mythology